Bănișor is a commune located in Sălaj County, Crișana, Romania. It is composed of three villages: Ban (Felsőbán), Bănișor and Peceiu (Pecsely).

References

Communes in Sălaj County
Localities in Crișana